Bagupi is a nearly extinct Madang language of Papua New Guinea. The language is under pressure from neighboring large languages such as Garuh, and Tok Pisin, which is taking its toll. Spoken in the Madang Province of Papua New Guinea. Spoken at the headwaters of the Gogol River, west of Mabanob, northwest of Madang town. Very little is still known about this unique language situated in Papua New Guinea.

References

Hanseman languages
Languages of Madang Province
Definitely endangered languages
Endangered Papuan languages